is a Japanese professional shogi player ranked 7-dan.

Shogi professional
Ina finished the 72nd Meijin Class C2 league (April 2013March 2014) with a record of 3 wins and 7 losses, earning a third demotion point, which meant automatic demotion to "Free Class" play.

Personal life
Ina's wife is a professional go player, while his younger sister is married to shogi professional Akira Watanabe.

Promotion history
The promotion history for Ina is as follows:
 6-kyū: 1990
 1-dan: 1992
 4-dan: April 1, 1998
 5-dan: August 13, 2004
 6-dan: May 22, 2008
 7-dan: October 23, 2019

References

External links
ShogiHub: Professional Player Info · Ina, Yusuke

Japanese shogi players
Living people
Professional shogi players
Professional shogi players from Kanagawa Prefecture
1975 births
Free class shogi players
People from Zushi, Kanagawa